Bob Bryan and Mike Bryan are the defending champions. However, they lost to Ashley Fisher and Stephen Huss in the semifinals.

Seeds

Draw

Finals

Top half

Bottom half

External links
 Draw

Sony Ericsson Open - Men's Doubles
2009 Sony Ericsson Open